Ural Oblast may refer to the following administrative units:

 Ural Oblast (1868–1920) (1868–1920), in the Russian Empire
 , in the Russian Republic
 Ural Oblast (1923–1934), an oblast of Soviet Russia
 Uralsk Oblast (1962–1992), the name of the West Kazakhstan Region

See also 
 Ural District (disambiguation)
 Ural (region)